Seggiano is a comune (municipality) in the Province of Grosseto in the Italian region Tuscany, located about  south of Florence and about  northeast of Grosseto.

The center is situated on the foothills of the north-western hills of Monte Amiata in a dominating position with respect to the underlying course of the Orcia river and its tributaries, Vivo and Ente.

Seggiano borders the following municipalities: Abbadia San Salvatore, Castel del Piano, Castiglione d'Orcia.

Near Seggiano is the "Giardino di Daniel Spoerri", a sculpture garden by the artist Daniel Spoerri.

Territory
It is bordered to the north by the municipality of Castiglione d'Orcia and the province of Siena, in the east with the same province and the municipality of Abbadia San Salvatore, while to the south and west borders the town of Castel del Piano.

With the exception of units of low hill near the beds of rivers, the region extends mainly in hilly and mountainous odds, but good exposure allows the cultivation of a species of olive, Olivastra Seggianese, called up to elevations of low mountains, managing to produce an oil of excellent quality.

History
The center was built in the early 10th century as a possession of the abbey of San Salvatore al Monte Amiata, which gave a thousand years after the rights of the Abbey of Saint Antimo.

Seggiano was ruled from Siena starting in the second half of the 13th century, during which exerted strong influences of the Salimbeni family until the 14th and the 15th century onwards Ugurgeri. In 1555, the town became part of the Grand Duchy of Tuscany.

Government

List of mayors

Culture
 Inside the Town Hall is the Center for Documentation of Cultural Heritage on Permanent Land, where you can get information on works of art that you can visit in the city, including the Madonna and Child Santi of Master of Panzano and two works from the school of the brothers Nasini.
Giardino di Daniel Spoerri, located a few kilometers from the village, is a scenic park-museum created by a Swiss artist, where are located many of his sculptures are well integrated in the environment.

Olearie (oil festival)
In December there is the traditional Olive Festival during which you can taste local products and visit the historical monuments in the country, including the old mill recently restored and opened to the public. In addition, the City Hall hosts many conferences on the theme of food.

Main sights

Historical center
The medieval origins can be traced in the walls built, in large part, the exterior walls of some buildings, access to the village is possible through three doors: Porta di San Gervasio, Porta degli Azzolini and Porta del Mercato.

Cisternone
Is an old collector of rainwater, recently renovated, located in the town center. The interior of this old building is designed to accept an olive plant supported by steel cables that will feed water vapor.

Religious architecture
''San Bartolomeo: 13th-century church, rebuilt over the centuries. The church has a nave and two aisles, and houses a 14th-century altarpiece attributed to Bulgarini, others attributed to Ugolino Lorenzetti, as well as frescoes of the 16th century.
Chiesa della Compagnia del Corpus Domini:
Includes San Bernardino following the transfer inside the shrine, with objects belonging to the saint, previously kept at the Convent of Colombaio.
Inside are placed some paintings depicting saints.
San Rocco: 15th-century oratory, built against the town walls, contains frescoes by Girolamo di Domenico.
Shrine of Our Lady of Charity: Renaissance church at the foot of the country and restored in later periods. The facade in the style is trachyte Baroque; very characteristic is the dome brick. The church has a fresco placed on the portal of the Annunciation, while inside there are several altars.
Convent of Colombaio:  monastery located not far from Castle Potentino, was the first monastery founded by Franciscan in the province of Grosseto.
Santa Maria in Villa: church just outside of town, with gabled facade and bell tower. It houses an icon of the Madonna surrounded by frescoes by Francesco Nasini with figures of angels and saints.
Sant'Antonio di Padova: chapel within the Castle Potentino

Architecture military
 Walls Seggiano
Made from 10th century, define and enclose the entire medieval village, which can be accessed through one of three doors that open along the walls.
 Castle Potentino
Is a medieval castle located a few miles downstream to the north-west of the country. The castle, which shows signs of restructuring the Renaissance, is home to a renowned farm and vineyard owned by the heirs of British writer Graham Greene.

References

External links

 Giardino di Daniel Spoerri
 The roots of Seggiano, the official website to promote the area, in Italian

Cities and towns in Tuscany